Augustus Samuel Miller (August 13, 1847 – September 26, 1905) was 22nd mayor of Providence, Rhode Island 1903–1905. He died while in office.

Personal life
Augustus S. Miller was born August 13, 1847, in Plainfield, Connecticut. His family ancestry can be traced back to Roger Williams. He graduated from Brown University in 1871.

Law career
After being admitted to the bar in 1874, Miller formed a law partnership with Henry J. Spooner, who later was elected Congressman Later he formed the firm Miller & Caroll with Thomas A. Carroll. He was vice president of the Rhode Island Bar Association.

Political career
Miller served several terms in the Rhode Island House of Representatives, and was speaker for two terms, 1889–1891. He also served two terms as state senator from Providence. Miller was elected to the mayor's office twice, in 1903 and 1904.

Death and burial
Miller died suddenly while socializing at the elite Hope Club in Providence in the early morning hours of September 26. He sank back in his chair and died before help could arrive. The cause was ruled as heart disease. His wife Elizabeth and son William D. survived him.

He is buried in Providence's North Burial Ground.

References

External links
 

1847 births
1905 deaths
Brown University alumni
People from Plainfield, Connecticut
Mayors of Providence, Rhode Island
Burials at North Burying Ground (Providence)
Democratic Party members of the Rhode Island House of Representatives
Rhode Island lawyers
19th-century American politicians